The Vee Cliffs are steep, mainly ice-covered cliffs, 7 km (4 nautical miles) long, between Aurora and the Terror Glacier on the south shore of Ross Island, Antarctica.

The name is suggested by two prominent V-shape wedges which protrude from the cliff wall. The name was first used by Dr. Edward A. Wilson who, with Thomas V. Hodgson of the Discovery expedition in 1901–04, visited the cliffs in November 1903.

Cliffs of Ross Island